Sari station is a railroad station on the Suin Line of the Seoul Metropolitan Subway in Ansan, Gyeonggi Province, South Korea. It opened on 12 September 2020.

References 

Metro stations in Ansan
Railway stations opened in 2020
Seoul Metropolitan Subway stations
2020 establishments in South Korea